Padraig McCarthy (born 18 July 1977) is an Irish Olympic eventing rider.

Representing Ireland, he competed at the 2015 European Eventing Championships at Blair Castle where he placed 9th in team eventing.

McCarthy was selected to compete at the 2016 Summer Olympics in Rio de Janeiro. He did not complete the individual event as he was eliminated after a fall during the cross-country stage. Irish team finished in 9th place in the team competition.

CCI5* Results

References

Living people
1977 births
Irish male equestrians
Equestrians at the 2016 Summer Olympics
Olympic equestrians of Ireland
20th-century Irish people
21st-century Irish people